Wulfhere (died ) was Archbishop of York between 854 and 900.

Life

Wulfhere was consecrated in 854.

In 866 the viking Great Heathen Army attacked and captured York, and the following year the "Danes" (as the English called vikings in general at the time)  defeated an attempt to recapture the city, by Anglo-Saxon forces, the following year. Wulfhere made peace with the invaders and stayed in York.

When, in 872, Northumbrians rebelled against the Danes and their collaborators, and Wulfhere fled York. Eventually he found refuge with King Burgred of Mercia.

Wulfhere was recalled in 873, and continued in York until his death in 892 or 900. After his death, the seat remained vacant for eight years.

Coinage 
Like previous archbishops of York, Wulfhere issued styca coins; Wulfred was his moneyer.

Citations

References

External links

9th-century births
900 deaths
Year of birth unknown
Archbishops of York
9th-century archbishops